The 1920 College Football All-Southern Team consists of American football players selected to the College Football All-Southern Teams selected by various organizations for the 1920 Southern Intercollegiate Athletic Association football season.

Georgia and Georgia Tech both had claims to the SIAA championship.

Composite eleven

The composite All-Southern eleven formed by the selection of 27 coaches and sporting writers culled by the Atlanta Constitution and Atlanta Journal included:
Red Barron, halfback for Georgia Tech, also an All-Southern baseball player who played pro ball with the Boston Braves. He later coached high school football.
Noah Caton, center for Auburn, died just two years later due to complications from an appendicitis operation.
Bum Day, center for Georgia, in 1918 as a player for Georgia Tech was the first Southern player selected first-team All-American by Walter Camp.
Bill Fincher, tackle for Georgia Tech, a unanimous selection and this year the third Southern player selected first-team All-American by Walter Camp, inducted into the College Football Hall of Fame in 1974. He also kicked.
Buck Flowers, halfback for Georgia Tech, inducted into the College Football Hall of Fame in 1955. He was selected for the Associated Press Southeast Area All-Time football team 1869–1919 era. He also kicked.
Bo McMillin, quarterback for Centre, the second Southern player selected first-team All-American by Walter Camp, inducted into the College Football Hall of Fame in 1951.
Artie Pew, tackle for Georgia, member of teams which over two years (1920 and 1921) did not lose to a single southern opponent. He also kicked. Pew was also a basketball player. 
Owen Reynolds, end for Georgia, played for the New York Giants in the inaugural season of 1925.
John Staton, end for Georgia Tech, later a Coca-Cola executive.
Riggs Stephenson, fullback for Alabama, later played professional baseball for the Cleveland Indians and Chicago Cubs.
Fatty Warren, guard for Auburn. He also kicked.

Composite overview
Bill Fincher received the most votes with 26.

All-Southerns of 1920

Ends

Owen Reynolds, Georgia (C, FA, CM, S, JD, D, MB, BD, ED, BH, ZN, BAH, JLR, CW, HG, CEB, BP, UT)
John Staton, Georgia Tech (C, MB, KS)
Terry Snoddy, Centre (C, WGF, BH, SM, ZN, HLL, JLR, CR)
Georgie Ratterman, Georgia Tech (C, FA, CM, BD, WGF)
Al Clemens, Alabama (C, X, ED, CW, CEB)
John Shirey, Auburn (X, D, BAH)
Dicky White, Tulane (KS, HLL)
M. C. Billingsley, Mississippi A&M (UT)

Tackles
 Bill Fincher*†, Georgia Tech (College Football Hall of Fame) (C, FA, CM, X, S, JD, D, MB, BD, ED, WGF, BH, SM, ZN, KS, HLL, BAH, JLR, CR, CW, HG, CEB, BP)
Artie Pew, Georgia (C, FA, CB, S, JD, MB, BD, ED, WGF, HLL [as g], BAH [as g], JLR, CW, HG, CEB, BP)
 Buck Hatcher, Tennessee (C, KS, HLL, UT)
 Bill James, Centre (C, CM [as g], BD [as g], ZN)
 Sully Montgomery, Centre (C, SM, JLR, CR)
Al Staton, Georgia Tech (C, S [as e], JD [as e], BAH, BP [as e])

Guards

Fatty Warren, Auburn (C, CM, X, JD, D [as t], BD, BH, SM, JLR, CR, S)
 Puss Whelchel, Georgia (C, X, D, BH, ZN, HG, BP)
 Yen Lightsey, Clemson (C, X [as t], S, JD, BD, BH [as t], UT)
 Emmett Sizemore, Auburn (C, KS, HLL)
 Dummy Lebey, Georgia Tech (C, FA, BAH)
 Tram Sessions, Alabama (C, MB, WGF, ZN)
 Noisy Grisham, Auburn (C, ED, CW, BP)
Oscar Davis, Georgia Tech (C)
 Manning Jeter, Furman (C, S)
James Pearce, Auburn (C)
Joe Bennett, Georgia (C)
 Gink Hendrick, Vanderbilt (C, FA, SM [as e], KS, CR [as e], UT [as t])
 Sidney Johnston, Alabama (D, CEB, UT)

Centers

 Bum Day, Georgia (C, FA, CM, S, JD, MB, WGF, BH, SM-as guard, KS, HLL, CR-as guard, CW, HG, CEB)
Noah Caton, Auburn (C [as g], X, D, MB [as g], ED, WGF [as g], ZN, BAH, CW [as g], HG [as g], CEB [as g], BP, S [as g])
 Red Weaver, Centre, (C, BD, SM, CR, UT)

Quarterbacks
 Bo McMillin, Centre (College Football Hall of Fame) (C, FA, CM, X, S, JD, MB, BD, ED, WGF, BH, SM, ZN, KS, HLL, JLR, CR, CW, HG, CEB, BP, UT)
Speedy Speer, Furman (C)
Frank Stubbs, Auburn (C, D)
Buck Cheves, Georgia (C)

Halfbacks

 Red Barron, Georgia Tech (C, FA, CM, X, S, JD, D, MB, ED, WGF, BH, SM, KS, HLL, BAH, JLR, CR, CW, HG, CEB, BP, UT)
 Buck Flowers, Georgia Tech (College Football Hall of Fame) (C, FA, CM, MB, BD, ED, WGF, BH, SM, ZN, KS, HLL, BAH [as qb], JLR, CR, CW, HG, CEB, BP, UT [as fb], S)
 Mullie Lenoir, Alabama (X, SM [as fb], CR [as fb])
 Reuben Blair, Tennessee (UT)

Fullbacks
Riggs Stephenson, Alabama (C, X, S [as hb], JD, D [as hb], BD [as hb], WGF, BH, ZN [as hb], KS, HLL, BAH [as hb], JLR, HG [as e], S)
 Ed Sherling, Auburn (C, FA, CM, S, JD [as hb], D, BD, ZN, BAH, BP)
 Judy Harlan, Georgia Tech (C, MB, ED, CW, HG, CEB)

Key
Bold = Composite selection

* = Consensus All-American

† = Unanimous selection

C = composite All-SIAA selection of 27 coaches and sporting writers culled by the Atlanta Constitution and Atlanta Journal. 

FA = selected by Frank Anderson, coach at Oglethorpe University.

CM = selected by Charley Moran, coach at Centre College. 

X = selected by Xen C. Scott, coach at the University of Alabama.

S = selected by H. J. Stegeman, coach at University of Georgia.

JD = selected by James DeHart, assistant coach at University of Georgia.

D = selected by Mike Donahue, coach at Auburn University. 

MB = selected by Morgan Blake, sports editor for the Atlanta Journal.

BD = selected by Bruce Dudley, sports editor for the Louisville Herald.

ED = selected by Ed Danforth, sports editor for the Atlanta Georgian.

WGF = selected by W. G. Foster, sports editor for the Chattanooga Times, along with S. J. McAllister, coach and official.

BH = selected by Blinkey Horn, sports editor for the Nashville Tennessean. 

SM = selected by Sam H. McMeekin of the Louisville Courier-Journal.

ZN = selected by Zipp Newman, sports editor for the Birmingham News.

KS = selected by the Knoxville Sentinel.

HLL = selected by H. L. Lesbon of the Knoxville Journal and Tribune.

BAH = selected by the Birmingham Age-Herald.

JLR = selected by J. L. Ray of the Nashville Banner.

CR = selected by Charles Rinehart, sports editor for the Louisville Courier-Journal.

CW = selected by Cliff Wheatley, sports editor for the Atlanta Constitution.

HG = selected by Homer George. 

CEB = selected by C. E. Baker of the Macon Telegraph.

BP = selected by Boozer Pitts, assistant at Auburn.

UT = selected by University of Tennessee student publication "Pigskin Number."

See also
1920 College Football All-America Team

References

1920 Southern Intercollegiate Athletic Association football season
College Football All-Southern Teams